The following is a list of episodes for the television sitcom December Bride, which aired for five seasons on CBS from 1954 to 1959.

Series overview

Episodes

Season 1 (1954–55)

Season 2 (1955–56)

Season 3 (1956–57)

Season 4 (1957–58)

Season 5 (1958–59)

References

December Bride